Latvia competed at the 2013 World Championships in Athletics in Moscow, Russia, from 10–18 August 2013.

Athletes  
10 athletes from Latvia will participate: Laura Ikauniece (Heptathlon), Madara Palameika, Līna Mūze, Vadims Vasiļevskis (all - Javelin throw), Lauma Grīva (Long jump), Igors Sokolovs (Hammer throw), Mareks Ārents (Pole vault), Agnese Pastare, Anita Kažemāka, and Arnis Rumbenieks (all - Walking).

References 

Nations at the 2013 World Championships in Athletics
2013 in Latvian sport
2013